Eilema barbata is a moth of the  subfamily Arctiinae. It is found in the Philippines.

References

barbata